Heavy Metal Islam is a 2008 non-fiction book by Mark LeVine, a professor of Middle East history. LeVine details the growth of heavy metal music in the Middle Eastern countries Morocco, Egypt, Palestine, Lebanon, Iran and Pakistan as he travels within those countries for five years. The book not only is just about his travels and heavy metal music, but was also meant as a promotional tool for his companion album.

References

2008 non-fiction books
Heavy metal publications
Books about the Middle East